The Alte Feste is a fortress and museum in downtown Windhoek, the capital of Namibia. It is situated in Robert Mugabe Avenue, next to the Independence Memorial Museum.

History
The building was designed by captain Curt von François to serve as headquarters of the imperial German Schutztruppe (colonial military force) during German colonization of South West Africa. The location of Windhoek, which was deserted and completely destroyed at that time, was chosen because the Germans felt it would serve as a buffer zone between the Nama and Herero tribes. The fort was, however, never involved in any military action.

The foundation was laid on 18 October 1890 by then Schutztruppe private Gustav Tünschel. The building was redesigned multiple times during the first years; its final layout was only completed in 1915. It consists of an inner courtyard with high walls and accommodation for the troops on the inside, as well as four towers. Alte Feste is the oldest surviving building in the city which subsequently developed around it.

After the World War I German surrender in South West Africa Windhoek was occupied by the South African Army in March 1915. Alte Feste now served as military headquarters for the South African Union troops.

In 1935 the fort was used for a more peaceful purpose when it was converted into a hostel for the adjacent Windhoek High School. Already severely dilapidated, it was declared a National Monument in 1957. The building was renovated extensively in 1963.

In 2010, the Reiterdenkmal, Windhoek's well-known equestrian monument, was placed in front of Alte Feste. It was removed and placed in storage on Christmas Day in 2013.

Usage
The building  accommodates the historic collection of the National Museum of Namibia.  Alte Feste is closed and in urgent need of renovation. It is planned to repurpose the building into a centre of arts, craft, and heritage.

References

Buildings and structures in Windhoek
1890 establishments in German South West Africa
German-Namibian culture
History of Windhoek
Museums in Namibia
National Monuments of Namibia
Castle museums